John Gleeson (22 June 1910 - December 1970) was an Irish hurler.  He played with his local club Roscrea and was a member of the Tipperary senior inter-county team in the late 1930s.  Gleeson won a set of All-Ireland and Munster winners' medals with Tipperary in 1937.

References

Teams

Roscrea hurlers
Tipperary inter-county hurlers
All-Ireland Senior Hurling Championship winners
1910 births
1970 deaths